The European Association for Theoretical Computer Science (EATCS) is an international organization with a European focus, founded in 1972. Its aim is to facilitate the exchange of ideas and results among theoretical computer scientists as well as to stimulate cooperation between the theoretical and the practical community in computer science.

The major activities of the EATCS are:

 Organization of ICALP, the International Colloquium on Automata, Languages and Programming;
 Publication of the Bulletin of the EATCS;
 Publication of a series of monographs and texts on theoretical computer science;
 Publication of the journal Theoretical Computer Science;
 Publication of the journal Fundamenta Informaticae.

EATCS Award 
Each year, the EATCS Award is awarded in recognition of a distinguished career in theoretical computer science. The first award was assigned to Richard Karp in 2000; the complete list of the winners is given below:

Presburger Award 

Starting in 2010, the European Association of Theoretical Computer Science (EATCS) confers each year at the conference ICALP the Presburger Award to a young scientist (in exceptional cases to several young scientists) for outstanding contributions in theoretical computer science, documented by a published paper or a series of published papers. The award is named after Mojzesz Presburger who accomplished his path-breaking work on decidability of the theory of addition (which today is called Presburger arithmetic) as a student in 1929. The complete list of the winners is given below:

EATCS Fellows 
The  EATCS  Fellows Program has been  established by the Association to recognize outstanding EATCS Members for their scientific achievements in the field of Theoretical Computer Science. The Fellow status is conferred by the EATCS Fellows-Selection Committee upon a person having a track record of intellectual and organizational leadership within the EATCS community. Fellows are expected to be “model citizens” of the TCS community, helping to develop the standing of TCS beyond the frontiers of the community.

Texts in Theoretical Computer Science

EATCS Bulletin 
The EATCS Bulletin is a newsletter of the EATCS, published online three times annually in February, June, and October respectively. The Bulletin is a medium for rapid publication and wide distribution of material such as:

 EATCS matters;
 information about the current ICALP;
 technical contributions;
 columns;
 surveys and tutorials;
 reports on conferences;
 calendar of events;
 reports on computer science departments and institutes;
 listings of technical reports and publications;
 book reviews;
 open problems and solutions;
 abstracts of PhD Theses;
 information on visitors at various institutions; and
 entertaining contributions and pictures related to computer science.

Since 2021 its editor-in-chief has been Stefan Schmid (TU Berlin).

EATCS Young Researchers Schools 
Beginning in 2014, the European Association for Theoretical Computer Science (EATCS) established a series of Young Researcher Schools on TCS topics. A brief history of the schools follows below.

See also 

 List of computer science awards

References

External links
 European Association for Theoretical Computer Science website

Computer science societies
Information technology organizations based in Europe
International organisations based in Italy
Organizations established in 1972
Theoretical computer science